Harry A. Merlo Field at the Clive Charles Soccer Complex is a 4,892-capacity soccer-specific stadium in Portland, Oregon on the campus of the University of Portland where it serves as home to the school's soccer teams. From March 29, 2015 until the end of 2016, the stadium played host to the Portland Timbers' USL side Portland Timbers 2.

History
The stadium was constructed in 1990. It is named after Harry A. Merlo, a businessman and philanthropist. Merlo Field hosted a quarter-final game in the 2001 Women's NCAA Division I Championship and then first and second-round games of the tournament in 2003. In 2004, the school added six light standards to illuminate the field to allow for night games at the venue. Pilots’ alumna Tiffeny Milbrett scored her 100th international goal at Merlo in a game for the United States women's national soccer team against Ukraine in July 2005.

In 2005, the Lady Pilots hosted an NCAA tournament semifinal game on their way to a national title. During the 2007 season the Pilots averaged 3,652 people per game in attendance at the 4,892 seat stadium for the women's home matches, leading the country in average attendance for the third straight year. In March 2008, the Portland Timbers used the facility to host an exhibition match against Major League Soccer’s San Jose Earthquakes. on July 17, 2010, the Portland Timbers held an exhibition match against English Premier league power and Europa League qualifier Manchester City at this facility.

The Portland Timbers used Merlo Field as their home pitch during the 2010 USSF D-2 playoffs.

Due to the renovation of Jeld-Wen Field, in their first home match as a MLS team, the Timbers used Merlo Field as their home pitch in their US Open Cup match against Chivas USA, winning 2-0.

The playing surface is managed by sports turf managers Kevin White CSFM, and Graham Harrison.

See also
 List of sports venues in Portland, Oregon

References

External links
 University of Portland Athletic Facilities

Portland Timbers
Portland Pilots soccer
Sports venues in Portland, Oregon
Soccer venues in Oregon
Sports venues completed in 1990
1990 establishments in Oregon